The 1995 World Rally Championship was the 23rd season of the Fédération Internationale de l'Automobile (FIA) World Rally Championship (WRC). The season consisted of 8 rallies. The drivers' world championship was won by Colin McRae in a Subaru Impreza 555, ahead of team-mate Carlos Sainz. The manufacturers' title was won by Subaru.

Toyota was caught using illegal turbo restrictors at the Rally Catalunya and were given a one-year ban by the FIA. FIA president Max Mosley called the illegal turbo restrictor "the most sophisticated device I've ever seen in 30 years of motor sports." Toyota and their drivers, Juha Kankkunen, Didier Auriol and Armin Schwarz, were also stripped of all points in the championships. Kankkunen had been in contention for the drivers' world title. Mosley stated that "there is no suggestion the drivers were aware of what was going on."

Calendar

Teams and drivers

Standings

Drivers' championship

Manufacturers' championship

Events

References

External links

 FIA World Rally Championship 1995 at ewrc-results.com
 1995 season at World Rally Archive

World Rally Championship
World Rally Championship seasons